The Rc class is the most used electric locomotive in Sweden. Rc is a universal locomotive used both in freight and passenger trains. The largest operator is Green Cargo, although SJ, Tågab, Hector Rail and the Swedish Transport Administration operate it as well. Previous operators include Veolia Transport.

History
The Rc-locomotive first appeared in 1967 to replace the older D-locomotives. The locomotives are notable for using thyristors instead of the older relay based system.

Usage
As of 2020, Rc-locomotives are still used all over Sweden in both passenger and freight lines, although on passenger trains they are slowly being replaced by new EMU, such as ER1.

Versions
Altogether, there have been eight versions of the Rc-locomotive in Sweden, including the freight locomotive Rm designed to pull iron ore trains. Rc1, Rc2, Rc4, and Rc5 have a maximum allowed speed of 135 km/h. Rc3 and Rc6 have a maximum allowed speed of 160 km/h. Rc7 was a rebuild of Rc6 meant to haul replacement trains needed when the X 2000 trains were canceled or delayed. Rc7 had a maximum allowed speed of 180 km/h. However, the maximum speed permitted without emergency electromagnetic track brakes is 160 km/h, and keeping extra carriages was considered too expensive. For that reason all Rc7 were subsequently converted back to Rc6. Rc1–Rc7 all weigh between 75 and 80 tonnes, whilst the Rm weighs 90 tonnes. The Rm's top speed is only 100 km/h and are more powerful locomotives.

Exports

Engines based on the Rc design were sold to other countries. The Austrian Federal Railways bought 10 Rc2 with extra brakes for the alpine conditions, ÖBB Class 1043. One of the locos was badly damaged in an accident but the remaining nine have been bought by the Swedish company Tågåkeriet i Bergslagen AB (TÅGAB), and returned to Sweden. A slightly altered Rc4 has been sold to Norwegian State Railways of Norway, known as El 16. The RAI 40-700 class (see Iranian Railways RC4) of eight engines were exported to Iran in the early eighties for use on the electrified stretches near the then-Soviet border; these were based on Rc4 but with Rm-type bogies, sand-proof air filters and no round windows on the side.  In 1977, an Rc4 was tested in the United States for use with Amtrak's passenger trains, designated as X995.  The Rc4 engine proved successful and would become the basis for the AEM-7.

Refurbished units
42 class Rc2 locomotives have been refurbished by Bombardier for Green Cargo. They include various upgrades and are now known as class Rd2.

Gallery

References

External links

 Photos of various Rc locomotives

Railway locomotives introduced in 1967
Electric locomotives of Sweden
15 kV AC locomotives
Bo′Bo′ locomotives
ASEA locomotives
Rc
Green Cargo locomotives
Rolling stock innovations
Standard gauge locomotives of Sweden